The Aesculapian Club of Edinburgh is one of the oldest medical dining clubs in the world. It was founded in April 1773 by Dr. Andrew Duncan.   Membership of the Club is limited to 11 Fellows of the Royal College of Physicians of Edinburgh and 11 Fellows of the Royal College of Surgeons of Edinburgh. 'Extraordinary Membership' is given to members aged over 70 years. The Club was established during the Scottish Enlightenment to encourage convivial relations between Fellows of the two Colleges and to stimulate intellectual discussion. The Club dinners are held in the New Library of the Royal College of Physicians of Edinburgh on the 2nd Friday of March and October each year. The principal guest at each dinner is invited to give a short talk on a non-medical subject and this is followed by a round-table discussion.

Founding members
There were 10 founding members of the Club who attended the first dinner on 2nd April 1773. The minutes of that meeting record that 'The Aesculapian Club was conceived in a happy moment, and in due time brought forth. Drs Duncan and Hamilton, Messrs Hay, Bell, McLure, and Dewar assisted at the birth on the first Friday of April 1773. They also stood as godfathers at the christening. The usual rites and ceremonies usual on these occasions, such as eating a good supper, etc., were concluded with a bumper recommendatory of the Club to the peculiar care of Apollo, of Bacchus, and of Venus, Floreat Res Medica. Vivat Veritas.' The Club was named after Asclepius, the Greek God of medicine, more usually known by the Roman name, Aesculapius. Aesculapius was the son of Apollo, who was himself both the God of physic and the sender of disease. The badge of the Club consists of the Latin motto 'Floreat Res Medica' (Let the medical field flourish) and a cockerel. Cockerels adorn many of the fixtures and fittings of the Royal College of Physicians of Edinburgh. In Greek mythology cockerels were dedicated to Apollo (because their crowing gave notice of the rising sun) and to Aesculapius (because their example of 'early to bed and early to rise' was associated with good health).

Former members and previous meetings

There have been 309 past and present members of the Aesculapian Club. Notable former Aesculpians include James Lind, Daniel Rutherford, Thomas Hope, James Syme, Sir James Young Simpson, Lord Joseph Lister, Joseph Bell, Douglas Argyll Robertson, Sir Thomas Clouston, Daniel Cunningham, James Haig Ferguson, Sir James Learmonth and Sir Stanley Davidson.

A photograph or picture of Aesculapians from 1821 to the present day is preserved in a 2-volume album. The first volume, which extends to 1939, is kept with other historic papers of the Club (including the minutes of previous meetings) in the library of the Royal College of Physicians of Edinburgh. The Club owns a considerable number of silver cups or pocula and other table adornments. These include six silver cups with circular rows of hooks, on each of which is hung a medallion with the engraved name, date of election and crest of a former Aesculapian. Three of these cups were presented by the Gymnastic Club (also founded by Dr Andrew Duncan) on its dissolution in 1836. One of the cups, which contains 9 medallions from 1788-1792, is on display in the National Museums of Scotland.

The Aesculapian Club was originally a supper club and met on the first Friday of every month in local taverns. In 1810, it was converted into a dinner club, with quarterly meetings in March, June, September and December in Edinburgh hotels. In 1924, the Royal College of Physicians of Edinburgh granted permission for the dinners to be held in the New Library. Although the frequency of dinners has been reduced over the years, the Club has met almost continually since its inception. The only times when the Club did not meet were between March 1915 to December 1919 (due to the First World War), October 1939 to December 1945 (due to the Second World War) and March 2020 to October 2021 (due to the COVID pandemic).

Current members and extraordinary members

Honorary Secretary
The Secretary of the Aesculapian Club acts also as the Treasurer and is responsible for the management of all affairs of the Club. The Secretary is appointed ad vitam aut culpam. There have been 16 secretaries of the Club: Dr Andrew Duncan (1773-1827); Dr Richard Huie (1827-1842); Dr Robert Omond (1842-1877); Dr Daniel Rutherford Haldane (1877-1887); Dr John Smith Jnr (1887-1905); Dr Charles Edward Underhill (1905-1908); Sir George Andreas Berry (1908-1924); Dr William Fordyce (1924-1933); Dr William James Stuart (1933-1949); Lt-Col Alexander Dron Stewart (1949-55); Professor Robert William Johnstone (1955-1958); Dr Clifford Kennedy (1958-1978); Mr Iain MacLaren 1978-2004; Dr Anthony 'Tony' Douglas Toft (2004-2014); Dr Kelvin 'Kel' Palmer (2014-2022); Professor Mark William John Strachan (2022-present). A badge for the Secretary was designed by Sir Andrew Douglas Maclagan in 1857. The badge consists of a silver medal bearing the name of the Club with a series of silver bars on the ribbon, each inscribed with the name of a Secretary and their years of office.

References

Organizations established in 1773
Organisations based in Edinburgh
Clubs and societies in Edinburgh